Mirosław Andrzej Bulzacki (born 23 October 1951 in Łódź) is a Polish former professional footballer who played as a defender.

Bulzacki was a longtime player of ŁKS Łódź.

He was capped 23 times for the Polish national team and participated in the 1974 FIFA World Cup, where Poland won the bronze medal.

Bulzacki later began on a coaching career.

References

1951 births
Living people
Footballers from Łódź
Association football defenders
Polish footballers
ŁKS Łódź players
Poland international footballers
Polish football managers
1974 FIFA World Cup players
Polish expatriate footballers
Polish expatriate sportspeople in Germany
Expatriate footballers in Germany